Lyndall Ryan,  (born 1943) is an Australian academic and historian. She has held positions in Australian Studies and Women's Studies at Griffith University and Flinders University and was Foundation Professor of Australian Studies and Head of School of Humanities at the University of Newcastle from 1998 to 2005. She is currently Conjoint Professor in the Centre for the History of Violence at the University of Newcastle.

Academic career
Ryan completed a PhD at Macquarie University in 1975, her thesis was titled "Aborigines in Tasmania, 1800–1974 and their problems with the Europeans".

Ryan's book  The Aboriginal Tasmanians, first published in 1981, presented a critical interpretation of the early history of relations between Tasmanian Aborigines and white settlers in Tasmania. A second edition was published by Allen & Unwin in 1996, in which she brought the story of the Tasmanian Aborigines in the 20th century up to date. Her work was later attacked by Keith Windschuttle based upon what he saw as discrepancies between Ryan's claims and her supporting evidence, thus drawing her into the "history wars". Ryan contested Windschuttle's claims in an essay entitled 'Who is the fabricator?' in Robert Manne's Whitewash: On Keith Windschuttle Fabrication of Aboriginal History published in 2003 and further addressed them in her book, Tasmanian Aborigines: A History Since 1803, published in 2012.

Colonial frontier massacres project

In 2017, Ryan and her team at the University of Newcastle released stage one of an on-line map showing more than 150 massacre sites in Eastern Australia. Within 6 months the site had received more than sixty thousand visitors and has received wide coverage in Australia and also internationally. The on-line tool records details and approximate locations of massacres and provides sources of corroborating evidence. The map is an important step in acknowledging the extensive violence used against indigenous people in Australia's history.

, the project had recorded at least 270 frontier massacres over a period of 140 years starting in 1794, considered "a state-sanctioned and organised attempt to eradicate Aboriginal people" by the writers of a Guardian special report which  draws on the research and map.

Recognition
Ryan was awarded the 2018 Annual History Citation by the History Council of NSW for "her research and teaching in women's and Indigenous history, and her service to the profession in contributing to the development of Australian Studies and Women's Studies". She was elected a Fellow of the Australian Academy of the Humanities in November 2018, and appointed a Member of the Order of Australia in the 2019 Australia Day Honours in recognition of her "significant service to higher education, particularly to Indigenous history and women's studies."

Bibliography

Books

Edited books

Reports

References

External links
Ryan, Lyndall (1943–, Australian Women's Register

'Colonial Frontier Massacres in Central and Eastern Australia 1788-1930' project and map

1943 births
Living people
20th-century Australian historians
20th-century Australian women writers
Australian women historians
Fellows of the Australian Academy of the Humanities
Academic staff of Flinders University
Academic staff of Griffith University
Historians of Australia
History of Indigenous Australians
Macquarie University alumni
Members of the Order of Australia
Academic staff of the University of Newcastle (Australia)
University of Sydney alumni